The Stan Lee Foundation is a non-profit organization that seeks to provide access to literacy, education and the arts throughout the United States. It was founded by comic creator Stan Lee in 2010 and Its leadership includes Lee (Chairman Emeritus), Theodore A. Adams, III (Chairman), and Junko Kobayashi (President).

References

External links
 

Educational foundations in the United States
Arts foundations based in the United States
Marvel Entertainment
Stan Lee